Luis Ramos (born 18 February 1966) is a Venezuelan footballer. He played in eight matches for the Venezuela national football team from 1996 to 1997. He was also part of Venezuela's squad for the 1997 Copa América tournament.

References

External links
 

1966 births
Living people
Venezuelan footballers
Venezuela international footballers
Place of birth missing (living people)
Association football midfielders